The Cerchezoaia is a right tributary of the river Prut in Romania. It flows into the Prut near Vladomira.

References

Rivers of Romania
Rivers of Iași County
Tributaries of the Prut